The 2015–16 Ford Trophy was the 45th season of the official List A cricket tournament in New Zealand, and the fifth in a sponsorship deal between New Zealand Cricket and Ford Motor Company. The competition ran from 27 December 2015 to 30 January 2016, and was won by the Central Districts.

Points table

 Teams qualified for the finals

Group stage

Round 1

Round 2

Round 3

Round 4

Round 5

Round 6

Round 7

Round 8

Finals

1st Preliminary Final

2nd Preliminary Final

3rd Preliminary Final

Final

References

External links
 Series home at ESPN Cricinfo

Ford Trophy
2015–16 New Zealand cricket season
Ford Trophy